Maleficium is the fifth album for Swedish heavy metal band Morgana Lefay.

The album received reviews of 4/5 from Allmusic, 8/10 from Metal Storm, 88/100 from Metallized.it, and 9/10 from Rockhard.de. In the Swedish mainstream press, the album got 3/5 in Aftonbladet and a score of "3 wasps" in Expressen.

Track listing
All music & lyrics written by: Morgana Lefay, except "Nemesis" written by Thomas Persson.

The Chamber of Confession - 2:15
The Source of Pain - 5:26
Victim of the Inquisition - 4:55
Madness - 6:58
A Final Farewell - 6:35
Maleficium - 5:37
It - 1:29
Master of the Masquerade - 4:39
Witches Garden - 4:31
Dragons Lair - 4:16
The Devil in Me - 6:34
Where Fallen Angels Rule - 4:00
Creatures of the Hierarchy - 5:08
Nemesis - 2:20

Credits 
 Charles Rytkönen – vocals
 Tony Eriksson – guitar
 Daniel Persson – guitar
 Joakim Heder – bass
 Jonas Söderlind – drums

References

Morgana Lefay albums
Albums with cover art by Kristian Wåhlin
1996 albums